Time-Flight is the seventh and final serial of the 19th season of the British science fiction television series Doctor Who, which was first broadcast in four twice-weekly parts on BBC1 from 22 to 30 March 1982.

The serial is set at the site of Heathrow Airport in the 1980s and 140 million years ago. In the serial, the alien time traveller the Master (Anthony Ainley) attempts to use the power of the psychic gestalt being the Xeraphin to power his damaged time machine.

Plot
The Fifth Doctor, Nyssa, and Tegan, still mourning the loss of their former companion Adric, arrive at Heathrow and learn from Department C19 that one of their Concordes mysteriously vanished just before landing. Using another Concorde with the TARDIS aboard, the Doctor and his companions join Captain Stapley and his crew to fly the same landing path. They appear to land at Heathrow, but the Doctor determines they have flown through a time corridor to 140 million years in the past, the illusion of Heathrow projected by a powerful psychokinetic field.

The crew and passengers of the missing Concorde believe they are at Heathrow but are enslaved to work under guard of Plasmatons, humanoid blobs of protein held together by the psychokinetic field. One passenger, Professor Hayter, has seen through the illusion, and lets the Doctor know that they have been forced to work by the mystic Kalid to break into a central chamber at a nearby Citadel. As the Doctor sets off to see Kalid, Stapley and Hayter attempt to break the other humans free of the illusion, while Nyssa, with her empathic abilities, is able to enter the central chamber freely, along with Tegan, to find the power source controlling the psychokinetic field. Nyssa briefly interrupts the power source, which causes Kalid's disguise to falter, revealing himself to the Doctor as the Master. The Master explains that he had been trapped in Earth's past after their last encounter, his own TARDIS damaged, and believed that he could repair it by acquiring the power source in the Citadel; he created the time corridor to obtain human slaves to help break the chamber open. However, now with the Doctor's TARDIS in his possession, the Master sets off in it to try to materialise in the central chamber.

The Doctor finds that the humans have finally broken through the chamber, and he soon joins Nyssa and Tegan inside. They find that the power source is a gestalt intelligence of numerous Xeraphin. Their ship had crashed some time ago, and to survive against high radiation levels, they took the form of energy in the gestalt. However, when the Master arrived, his presence caused the gestalt to develop a split personality, some willing to help the Master while others fight against him. The Master is unable to materialise the Doctor's TARDIS into the chamber but instead uses it to create an induction loop to transfer the gestalt to his TARDIS. On returning to his TARDIS, he finds that Stapley and Hayter have taken some of the key circuitry in their attempt to free the others, and he attempts to scavenge those parts from the Doctor's TARDIS. The Doctor proposes a truce, providing the spare parts including a temporal limiter, to repair the Master's TARDIS in exchange for dropping the psychokinetic field. The Master agrees, and quickly dematerialises when his TARDIS is ready. The Doctor ushers his companions and the freed humans to one of the Concordes, and uses his TARDIS to bring them back to the present at Heathrow. He reveals he programmed the temporal limiter to have the Master arrive later than they did, and thus is able to prevent the Master's TARDIS from rematerialising. Instead, as the Doctor had programmed, it will now rematerialise on the Xeraphin's home planet.

After saying goodbye to Stapley and the rescued passengers, the Doctor and Nyssa leave. Tegan races out of the airport as the TARDIS vanishes, upset at being left behind.

Production

The Concorde used for the production was G-BOAC, the flagship of the BA fleet at the time. The registry can be read from the radar screen in the ATC scenes. The other registry, G-BAVF, was not a Concorde, but a Beechcraft 58 twin-engined light executive aircraft.

Peter Davison has said Time-Flight was the biggest disappointment from his time on the series, stating it was a "very good story, but we had run out of money. We filmed the prehistoric landscape of Heathrow airport in Studio 8 [at TV Centre] with a model Concorde in the back of the studio. The monsters were bits of foam. We didn't do the story justice."

Cast notes

In order to hide the Master's involvement in this story, the first episode did not credit Anthony Ainley as the Master. Instead, the credits and Radio Times listed "Leon Ny Taiy" (an anagram of "Tony Ainley") as playing Kalid. Keith Drinkel would later play Henry Hallam in the audio play Catch-1782.

Although his character had been killed in the previous story, Matthew Waterhouse's contract extended into the filming of Time-Flight, which is the reason for Adric's illusory appearance in Part Two. Tegan's apparent departure from the series was never intended to be permanent, but was planned as a sort of cliffhanger-ending to the 19th season. She would later return in the second episode of the next story, Arc of Infinity.

Commercial releases

In print

A novelisation of this serial, written by Peter Grimwade, was published by Target Books in January 1983.  An Audiobook of this novelisation read by Peter Davison was published in April 2021.

Home media
Time-Flight was released on VHS in July 2000. A double-pack DVD featuring both Time-Flight and Arc of Infinity was released on 6 August 2007. This serial was released as part of the Doctor Who DVD Files in Issue 135 on 5 March 2014.

References

External links

Target novelisation

Doctor Who serials novelised by Peter Grimwade
Fifth Doctor serials
The Master (Doctor Who) television stories
1982 British television episodes
Doctor Who stories set on Earth
Fiction set in 1982